Ricky Williams (born 1977) is a former American football running back (New Orleans Saints, Miami Dolphins, and Baltimore Ravens).

Ricky or Rick Williams may also refer to:

Entertainment
Ricky Williams (musician) (1956–1992), vocalist
Ricky Williams (The Young and the Restless), fictional character from The Young and the Restless

Politics
Rick Williams (Australian politician), member of the Legislative Assembly of Queensland
Rick Williams (Georgia politician), member of the Georgia House of Representatives

Sports
Ricky Williams (American football, born 1978), former running back who played with the Indianapolis Colts
Rick Williams (baseball, born 1952), American major league pitcher for the Houston Astros
Rick Williams (baseball, born 1956), American scout and former coach and minor league player, son of Dick Williams
Ricky Williams (darts player) (born 1989), British darts player

See also
Richard Williams (disambiguation)
Ricardo Williams (disambiguation)